Per- and polyfluoroalkyl substances (PFASs) are synthetic organofluorine chemical compounds that have multiple fluorine atoms attached to an alkyl chain. An early definition, from 2011, required that they contain at least one perfluoroalkyl moiety, –CnF2n+1–. Beginning in 2021, the Organisation for Economic Co-operation and Development (OECD) expanded their terminology, stating that "PFASs are defined as fluorinated substances that contain at least one fully fluorinated methyl or methylene carbon atom (without any H/Cl/Br/I atom attached to it), i.e. with a few noted exceptions, any chemical with at least a perfluorinated methyl group (–CF3) or a perfluorinated methylene group (–CF2–) is a PFAS."

According to the OECD, at least 4,730 distinct PFASs are known, which contain at least three perfluorinated carbon atoms. The United States Environmental Protection Agency (EPA) toxicity database, DSSTox, lists 14,735 unique PFAS chemical compounds. PubChem lists approximately 6 million. The fluorosurfactants or fluorinated surfactants subgroup, has a fluorinated "tail" and a hydrophilic "head" and are thus considered surfactants. These are more effective at reducing the surface tension of water than comparable hydrocarbon surfactants. They include the perfluorosulfonic acids, such as perfluorooctanesulfonic acid (PFOS) and the perfluorocarboxylic acids like perfluorooctanoic acid (PFOA).

Many PFASs were used in the mid-20th century in products and on materials due to their enhanced water-resistant properties, such as within Teflon or aqueous film forming foam. Only since the start of the 21st century has the environmental impact and toxicity to human and mammalian life been studied in depth. PFOS, PFOA and other PFASs are commonly described as persistent organic pollutants because they remain in the environment for long periods of time, and are also known as "forever chemicals". Residues have been detected in humans and wildlife, prompting concern about impacts to health. According to the National Academies of Sciences, Engineering, and Medicine, PFAS exposure is linked to increased risk of dyslipidemia (abnormally high cholesterol), suboptimal antibody response, reduced infant and fetal growth, and higher rates of kidney cancer.  

Health concerns related to PFASs have resulted in numerous litigations (see Timeline of events related to per- and polyfluoroalkyl substances). In 2021, Maine became the first U.S. state to ban these compounds in all products by 2030, except for instances deemed "currently unavoidable".

Fluorosurfactants

Fluorosurfactants are surfactants containing fluorocarbon chains such as those in PFASs. They can reduce the surface tension of water below what is attainable by using hydrocarbon surfactants. This ability is due to the hydrophobic nature of fluorocarbons, so fluorosurfactants tend to concentrate at the liquid-air interface. Fluorocarbons are lipophobic, as well as hydrophobic, allowing them to repel both oil and water. This lipophobicity results from the lack of attractive London dispersion forces in fluorocarbons compared to hydrocarbons, a consequence of fluorine's large electronegativity and small bond length, which reduce the polarizability of the surfactants' fluorinated molecular surface. Fluorosurfactants are more stable and fit for harsher conditions than hydrocarbon surfactants because of the stability of the carbon–fluorine bond. Perfluorinated surfactants persist in the environment for this same reason.

Economic role
PFASs play a key economic role for companies such as DuPont, 3M, and W. L. Gore & Associates because they are used in emulsion polymerization to produce fluoropolymers. They have two main markets: a $1 billion annual market for use in stain repellents, and a $100 million annual market for use in polishes, paints, and coatings.

Health and environmental concerns

Human health concerns associated with PFASs 
On their introduction in the 1940s, per- and polyfluoroalkyl substances (PFASs) were considered inert. In fact, early occupational studies revealed elevated levels of fluorochemicals, including perfluorooctanesulfonic acid (PFOS) and perfluorooctanoic acid (PFOA, C8), in the blood of exposed industrial workers, but cited no ill health effects. These results were consistent with the measured serum concentrations of PFOS and PFOA in 3M plant workers ranging from 0.04 to 10.06 ppm and 0.01 to 12.70 ppm respectively, well below toxic and carcinogenic levels cited in animal studies. Given, however,  the "forever chemical" property of PFASs (serum elimination half-life 4–5 years) and widespread environmental contamination, molecules have been shown to accumulate in humans to such a degree that adverse health outcomes have resulted.

Hormone-disrupting chemicals, including PFASs, are linked with rapid declines in human fertility. In a meta-analysis for associations between PFASs and human clinical biomarkers for liver injury, authors considered both PFAS effects on liver biomarkers and histological data from rodent experimental studies and concluded that evidence exists showing that PFOA, perfluorohexanesulfonic acid (PFHxS), and perfluorononanoic acid (PFNA) are hepatotoxic to humans.

Many comprehensive epidemiological studies linking adverse human health effects to PFASs, particularly PFOA, come from the C8 Science Panel. This panel was formed as part of a contingency to a class action lawsuit brought by communities in the Ohio River Valley against DuPont in response to landfill and wastewater dumping of PFAS-laden material from DuPont's West Virginia Washington Works Plant. The panel measured PFOA (also known as C8) serum concentrations in 69,000 individuals from around DuPont's Washington Works Plant and found a mean concentration of 83.0 ng/mL, compared to 4 ng/mL in a standard population of Americans. This panel reported probable links between elevated PFOA blood concentration and hypercholesterolemia, ulcerative colitis, thyroid disease, testicular cancer, kidney cancer as well as pregnancy-induced hypertension and preeclampsia.

Prevalence in rainwater 
In 2022 it was found that levels of at least four perfluoroalkyl acids (PFAAs) in rainwater worldwide ubiquitously, and often greatly, exceeded the EPA's lifetime drinking water health advisories as well as comparable Danish, Dutch, and European Union safety standards, leading researchers to conclude that "the global spread of these four PFAAs in the atmosphere has led to the planetary boundary for chemical pollution being exceeded". There are some moves to restrict and replace their use.

Estimated contemporary costs 

In a report by the Nordic Council of Ministers the total annual health-related costs associated with human exposure to PFASs were estimated to be at least €52-€84 billion in the European Economic Area (EEA) countries. For the United States, estimated PFAS-attributable disease costs amount to 6–62 billion US$. Aggregated annual costs covering environmental screening, monitoring where contamination is found, water treatment, soil remediation and health assessment total €821 million-€170 billion in the EEA plus Switzerland.

Proposed mechanisms of PFAS-related adverse health outcomes

Hypercholesterolemia 
Animal studies in the 1990s and early 2000s primarily aimed to investigate the effect of two widely used long-chain PFASs, perfluorooctanoic acid (PFOA, C8) and perfluorooctane sulphonic acid (PFOS, C8), on peroxisome proliferation in rat livers. These studies determined that PFOA and PFOS acted as peroxisome proliferator-activated receptor (PPAR) agonists, increasing lipid metabolism. A paradoxical response is observed in humans where elevated PFOS levels were significantly associated with elevated total cholesterol and LDL cholesterol, highlighting significantly reduced PPAR expression and alluding to PPAR independent pathways predominating over lipid metabolism in humans compared to rodents.

Ulcerative colitis 
PFOA and PFOS have been shown to significantly alter immune and inflammatory responses in human and animal species. In particular, IgA, IgE (in females only) and C-reactive protein have been shown to decrease whereas antinuclear antibodies increase as PFOA serum concentrations increase. These cytokine variations allude to immune response aberrations resulting in autoimmunity. Elevated levels of hydrogen sulfide result which reduce beta-oxidation and thus nutrient production leading to a breakdown of the colonic epithelial barrier.

Thyroid disease 
Hypothyroidism is the most common thyroid abnormality associated with PFAS exposure. PFASs have been shown to decrease thyroid peroxidase, resulting in decreased production and activation of thyroid hormones in vivo. Other proposed mechanisms include alterations in thyroid hormone signaling, metabolism and excretion as well as function of nuclear hormone receptor.

Cancer 
Rat studies investigating the carcinogenicity of PFASs reported significant correlation with liver adenomas, Leydig cell tumors of the testis and pancreatic acinar cell tumors and dietary PFOA consumption. The C8 Science Panel investigated the potential relationship between PFAS exposure and these three cancer types as well as 18 other cancer types in their epidemiological studies. Contrary to the animal studies, the C8 studies did not find a probable link between elevated C8 exposure and liver adenomas or pancreatic acinar cell tumors; however, a probable link was found with regards to testis and kidney cancer. Two mechanisms have been proposed by which PFOA could cause Leydig cell tumors. Both mechanisms start by proposing that PROA exposure results in increased PPAR alpha activation in the liver which increases hepatic aromatase concentration and subsequent serum estrogen levels. The mechanisms now diverge, with one pathway suggesting elevated estradiol levels increase Tissue Growth Factor alpha (TGF alpha) which prompts Leydig cell proliferation. The other pathway suggests that aromatization of testosterone to estradiol reduces serum testosterone levels resulting in increased release of luteinizing hormone (LH) from the pituitary gland which directly results in Leydig Cell tumorgenesis. A mechanism has not yet been proposed to explain how kidney cancer could be caused by C8 exposure as no in vivo animal studies have been able to model this epidemiological outcome.

Pregnancy-induced hypertension and pre-eclampsia 
Pregnancy-induced hypertension is diagnosed when maternal systolic blood pressure exceeds 140 mmHg or diastolic blood pressure exceeds 90mmHg after 20 weeks gestation. Diagnostic criteria are the same for pre-eclampsia as pregnancy-induced hypertension; however, it also confers proteinuria. Mechanisms by which pregnancy-induced hypertension and preeclampsia could be caused by PFAS exposure have remained elusive and are largely speculative to date. One proposed mechanism highlights alterations in immune function leading to disruption of placentation, specifically as it pertains to natural killer (NK) cell infiltration of the placenta to facilitate trophoblastic integration with placental blood supply. Another mechanism refers to agonism of PPARs contributing to alterations in cholesterol, triglyceride and uric acid levels which may lead to vascular inflammation and elevated blood pressure.

Other adverse health outcomes that have been attributed to elevated PFAS exposure but were not found to be probable links in the C8 studies are decreased antibody response to vaccines, asthma, decreased mammary gland development, low birth weight (-0.7oz per 1 ng/mL increase in blood PFOA or PFOS level), decreased bone mineral density and neurodevelopmental abnormalities.

"Forever chemicals" 
Fluorosurfactants such as PFOS, PFOA, and PFNA have caught the attention of regulatory agencies because of their persistence, toxicity, and widespread occurrence in the blood of general populations and wildlife. In 2009, PFOS, its salts and perfluorooctanesulfonyl fluoride were listed as persistent organic pollutants under the Stockholm Convention, due to their ubiquitous, persistent, bioaccumulative, and toxic nature. PFAS chemicals were dubbed the "Forever Chemicals" following a 2018 op-ed in the Washington Post. The nickname was derived by combining the two dominant attributes of this class of chemicals: 1) PFAS chemicals are characterized by a carbon-fluorine (C-F) backbone (the "F-C" in "Forever Chemicals"); and 2) the carbon fluorine bond is one of the strongest bonds in organic chemistry, which gives these chemicals an extremely long environmental half-life (the "Forever" in "Forever Chemicals"). The Forever Chemicals name is now commonly used in media outlets in addition to the more technical name of per- and polyfluorinated alkyl substances, or PFASs. Their production has been regulated or phased out by manufacturers, such as 3M, DuPont, Daikin, and Miteni in the US, Japan, and Europe. In 2006 3M replaced PFOS and PFOA with short-chain PFASs, such as perfluorohexanoic acid (PFHxA) and perfluorobutanesulfonic acid (PFBS). Shorter fluorosurfactants may be less prone to accumulating in mammals; there is still concern that they may be harmful to both humans, and the environment. A majority of PFASs are either not covered by European legislation or are excluded from registration obligations under the EU REACH chemical regulation. Several PFASs have been detected in drinking water, municipal wastewater and landfill leachates, worldwide.

It had been thought that perfluoroalkyl acids (PFAAs) would eventually end up in the oceans, where they would be diluted over decades, but a field study published in 2021 by researchers at Stockholm University found that they are significantly transferred from water to air when waves break on land, and are a significant source of air pollution, and eventually get into the rain. The researchers concluded that pollution "may impact large areas of inland Europe and other continents, in addition to coastal areas".

Bioaccumulation and biomagnification 

Bioaccumulation is the process by which PFASs are transferred into the tissue of any exposed organisms where PFASs accumulate over time since organisms lack natural excretion mechanisms. PFASs can accumulate in marine species by a variety of pathways. They can be absorbed from the environment, such as contaminated sediments or PFASs dissolved in water. PFASs can partition into the organs and tissues of marine organisms from these environmental compartments. They have been shown to bind to blood proteins and accumulate in the livers of marine animals. Another pathway for bioaccumulation is predation. As larger marine animals feed on smaller organisms that have been exposed to PFASs, the larger animals absorb the PFASs contained in their prey.

Biomagnification is the process by which the amount of PFAS contamination increases with increasing trophic level, due to predation by the species higher in the food web. Top predators have higher levels of PFASs than species lower down the food chain. Seabirds that feed on fish have among the highest levels of PFAS contamination. Perfluorosulfonic acids, which have a sulfonic acid functional group attached to the fluorinated "tail", have a greater tendency to bioaccumulate than perfluorocarboxylic acids, which contain a carboxylic acid function group. Longer chain PFAS compounds, which have 6, 7, or more fluorinated carbons, bioaccumulate in greater quantities than shorter chain PFAS compounds.

In marine species of the food web
The concentration of PFOS, a long chain sulfonic acid, was found at the highest concentrations relative to other PFASs measured in fish and birds in Northern seas such as the Barents Sea and the Canadian Arctic. A study and an interactive map by EWG using its results showed freshwater fish in the U.S. ubiquitously contain high levels of harmful PFAS, with a single serving typically significantly increasing the blood PFOS level.

Bioaccumulation and biomagnification of PFASs in marine species throughout the food web, particularly frequently consumed fish and shellfish, can have important impacts on human populations.  PFASs have been frequently documented in both fish and shellfish that are commonly consumed by human populations. This poses health risks to humans and studies on the bioaccumulation in certain species are important to determine daily tolerable limits for human consumption, and where those limits may be exceeded causing potential health risks. This has particular implications for populations that consume larger numbers of wild fish and shellfish species. In addition to health risks, populations may be impacted by advisories, limits of closures of fishing for certain species that are put in place to help mitigate health risks from potential consumption of species with higher levels of accumulated PFASs, but result in a loss of food sources and important subsistence species depended on by local communities. There is much research being done in this area, including into spatial patterns of PFAS bioaccumulation in fish and crustaceans but more research is also needed. There is a need for more research on membrane transport mechanisms, which transfer PFAS into marine organisms, and the biological behavior of shorter chain PFASs.

Australia 
In 2017, the ABC's current affairs programme Four Corners reported that the storage and use of firefighting foams containing perfluorinated surfactants at Australian Defence Force facilities around Australia had contaminated nearby water resources. In 2019, remediation efforts at RAAF Base Tindal and the adjacent town of Katherine were ongoing. In the 2022 Australian federal budget $428million was allocated for works at HMAS Albatross, RAAF Base Amberley, RAAF Base Pearce and RAAF Base Richmond including funding to remediate PFAS contamination.

Canada 
Although PFASs are not manufactured in Canada, they may be present in imported goods and products. In 2008, Canada prohibited the import, sale, or use of PFOS or PFOS-containing products, with some exceptions for products used in firefighting, in the military, and some forms of ink and photo media.

Health Canada has published drinking water guidelines for maximum concentrations of PFOS and PFOA. The guidelines were established to protect the health of Canadians, including children, over a lifetime's exposure to these substances. The maximum allowable concentration for PFOS under the guidelines is 0.0002 milligrams per litre. The maximum allowable concentration for PFOA is 0.0006 milligrams per litre.

United Kingdom 
The environmental consequences of PFAS - especially from fire fighting activities - has been recognised since the mid 1990s and came to prominence after the Buncefield explosion on 11 December 2005. In recent years the Environment Agency has undertaken a series of projects to understand the scale and nature of PFAS in the environment.
The Drinking Water Inspectorate requires water companies to report concentrations of 47 PFAS.Requirements for PFAS monitoring by water companies in England and Wales

European Union 
In 2019, the European Council requested the European Commission to develop an action plan to eliminate all non-essential uses of PFAS due to the growing evidence of adverse effects caused by exposure to these substances, the evidence for the widespread occurrence of PFAS in water, soil, articles and waste and the threat it can pose to drinking water. At the initiative of Germany and the Netherlands, these countries, together with Denmark, Norway and Sweden submitted a so-called restriction proposal based on the REACH Regulation to achieve a European ban on the production, use, sale and import of PFAS. The proposal states that a ban is necessary for all use of PFAS, with different periods for different applications when the ban takes effect (immediately after the restriction comes into force, 5 years afterwards or 12 years afterwards), depending on the function and the availability of alternatives. The proposal has not assessed the use of PFAS in medicines, plant protection products and biocides because specific regulations apply to those substances (Biocidal Products Regulation, Plant Protection Products Regulation, Medicinal Products Regulation) that have an explicit authorization procedure that focuses on risk for health and the environment.

The proposal was submitted on 13 January 2023 and published by the European Chemicals Agency (ECHA) on 7 February of the same year. From 22 March to 21 September 2023, citizens, companies and other organizations can comment on the proposal during a public consultation. Based on the information in the restriction proposal and the consultation, two committees from ECHA formulate an opinion on the risk and socio-economic aspects of the proposed restriction, respectively. Within a year of publication, the opinions are sent to the European Commission, which then makes a final proposal that is submitted to the EU Member States for discussion and decision. Eighteen months after the publication of the restriction decision, it will enter the ban. Of course, the restriction may differ from the proposal.

Italy 
Over 350,000 residents in Veneto are estimated to have been exposed to contamination through tap water, it is Europe's biggest PFAS-related environmental disaster.
While Italy's National Health Institute (ISS, Istituto Superiore di Sanità) set the threshold limit of PFOA in the bloodstream at 8 nanograms per milliliter (ng/mL), some residents had reached 262 and some industrial employees reach 91,900 ng/mL.
In 2021 some data has been disclosed by Greenpeace and other local citizens after a long legal battle against the Veneto Region and ISS, which for years has denied access to data that despite the alarming values known since or even before 2017 the Veneto Region has not carried out further monitoring or taken resolutive actions to eliminate pollution and reduce, at least gradually, the contamination of water not intended for drinking.
Furthermore, as far as is known, it appears that the Region has so far ignored the risk for the entire national community and beyond, given that some of these foods could also be sold abroad.
Although in 2020 the European Food Safety Agency (EFSA) has reduced by more than four times the maximum tolerable limit of PSAS that can be taken through the diet, the Region has not carried out new assessments or implemented concrete actions to protect the population and the agri-food and livestock sectors. To this are added some limits on the monitoring of the monitored geographical area, which does not include the orange zone and other areas affected by contamination, as well as the insufficiency of analysis on important productions widespread in the areas concerned: eggs (up to 37100 ng/kg), fish (18600 ng/kg) spinach and radicchio (only one sampling carried out), kiwis, melons, watermelons, cereals (only one spelled sample was analyzed), soy, wines (very famous from the region) and apples.
The most polluted area is near the Lombardia region which has no data public for this kind of pollutant.

United States

In products 

Certain PFASs are no longer manufactured in the United States, as a result of phase-outs including the PFOA Stewardship Program (2010-2015), in which eight major chemical manufacturers agreed to eliminate the use of PFOA and PFOA-related chemicals in their products and as emissions from their facilities. Although PFOA and PFOS are no longer manufactured in the United States, they are still produced internationally and are imported into the US in consumer goods such as carpet, leather and apparel, textiles, paper and packaging, coatings, rubber and plastics.

In 2020, manufacturers and the Food and Drug Administration (FDA) announced an agreement to phase out some types of PFAS which are used in food packaging by 2024.

PFASs are also used by major companies of the cosmetics industry in a wide range of cosmetics, including lipstick, eye liner, mascara, foundation, concealer, lip balm, blush, nail polish and other such products. A 2021 study tested 231 makeup and personal care products and found organic fluorine, an indicator of PFASs, in more than half of the samples. High levels of fluorine were most commonly identified in waterproof mascara (82% of brands tested), foundations (63%), and liquid lipstick (62%). As many as 13 types of individual PFAS compounds were found in each product. Since PFAS compounds are highly mobile, they are readily absorbed through human skin and through tear ducts, and such products on lips are often unwittingly ingested. Manufacturers often fail to label their products as containing PFASs, which makes it difficult for cosmetics consumers to avoid products containing PFASs. In response, Senators Susan Collins of Maine and Richard Blumenthal of Connecticut proposed the No PFAS in Cosmetics Act in the United States Senate. It was also introduced in the United States House of Representatives by Michigan Representative Debbie Dingell. The U.S. chemical industry lobby however, armed with many billions of dollars, has killed efforts to regulate this.

Contaminated sites, drinking water and wastewater 
An estimated 26,000 U.S. sites are contaminated with PFASs. At least six million Americans are estimated to have drinking water containing PFASs above the safe limit published prior to 2022 by the U.S. Environmental Protection Agency (EPA). More than 200 million Americans are estimated to live in places where the tap water PFAS level (a combination of PFOA and PFOS levels) exceeds the 1 ppm (part per million) limit set in 2022 by the EPA.

EPA published non-enforceable drinking water health advisories for PFOA and PFOS in 2016. In March 2021 EPA announced that it will develop national drinking water standards for PFOA and PFOS. On December 27, 2021, EPA published a regulation requiring drinking water utilities to conduct monitoring for 29 compounds. The data are to be collected during 2023 to 2025. EPA will pay for the monitoring costs for small drinking water systems (those serving a population of 10,000 or fewer). The agency may use the monitoring data to develop additional regulations.

In mid-2021 EPA announced plans to revise federal wastewater regulations (effluent guidelines) for several industries that manufacture PFASs or use PFASs in fabricating various products.

In October 2021 EPA announced the PFAS Strategic Roadmap. This initiative is a "whole-of-EPA" strategy and considers the full lifecycle of PFAS—including drinking water monitoring and risk assessment for PFOA and PFOS in biosolids (processed wastewater sludge used as fertilizer).

The EPA issued health advisories for four specific PFASs in June 2022, significantly lowering their safe threshold levels for drinking water. PFOA was reduced from 70 ppt to 0.004 ppt, while PFOS was reduced from 70 ppt to 0.02 ppt. GenX's safe levels were set at 10 ppt, while PFBS were set to 2000 ppt. While not enforceable, these health advisories are intended to be acted on by states in setting their own drinking water standards.

A formal EPA rule to add PFOA and PFAS as hazardous chemicals was first issued for comment on August 26, 2022. This would require those discharging waste to monitor and restrict the release of these PFAS to set levels, and report when the wastewater exceeds it. It would also make grounds affected by high levels of PFIA or PFAS to be treated as Superfund cleanup sites.

EPA has listed recommended steps that consumers may take to reduce possible exposure to PFAS chemicals.

California 
In 2021 California banned PFASs for use in food packaging and from infant and children's products and also required PFAS cookware in the state to carry a warning label.

Maine 
A program licensed and promoted by the Maine Department of Environmental Protection that provided free municipal wastewater sludge (biosolids) to farmers as fertilizer has resulted in PFAS contamination of local drinking water and farm-grown produce.

Michigan 
Launched in 2017, the Michigan PFAS Action Response Team (MPART) is the first multi-agency action team of its kind in the nation. Agencies representing health, environment, and other branches of state government have joined together to investigate sources and locations of PFAS contamination in the state, take action to protect people's drinking water, and keep the public informed.

Groundwater is tested at locations throughout the state by various parties to ensure safety, compliance with regulations, and proactively detect and remedy potential problems. In 2010, the Michigan Department of Environmental Quality (MDEQ) discovered levels of PFASs in groundwater monitoring wells at the former Wurtsmith Air Force Base. As additional information became available from other national testing, Michigan expanded its investigations into other locations where PFAS compounds were potentially used.

In 2018, the MDEQ's Remediation and Redevelopment Division (RRD) established cleanup criteria for groundwater used as drinking water of 70 ppt of PFOA and PFOS, individually or combined. The RRD staff are responsible for implementing these criteria as part of their ongoing efforts to clean up sites of environmental contamination. The RRD staff are the lead investigators at most of the PFAS sites on the MPART website and also conduct interim response activities, such as coordinating bottled water or filter installations with local health departments at sites under investigation or with known PFAS concerns. Most of the groundwater sampling at PFAS sites under RRD's lead is conducted by contractors familiar with PFAS sampling techniques. The RRD also has a Geologic Services Unit, with staff who install monitoring wells and are also well versed with PFAS sampling techniques.

The MDEQ has been conducting environmental clean-up of regulated contaminants for decades. Due to the evolving nature of PFAS regulations as new science becomes available, the RRD is evaluating the need for regular PFAS sampling at Superfund sites and is including an evaluation of PFAS sampling needs as part of a Baseline Environmental Assessment review.

Earlier in 2018, the RRD purchased lab equipment that will allow the MDEQ Environmental Lab to conduct analyses of certain PFAS samples. (Currently, most samples are shipped to one of the few labs in the country that conduct PFAS analysis, in California, although private labs in other parts of the country, including Michigan, are starting to offer these services.) As of August 2018, RRD has hired additional staff to work on developing the methodology and conducting PFAS analyses.

In 2020 Michigan Attorney General Dana Nessel filed a lawsuit against 17 companies, including 3M, Chemours, and DuPont, for hiding known health and environmental risks from the state and its residents. Nessel's complaint identifies 37 sites with known contamination.

In 2020 the Michigan Department of Environment, Great Lakes, and Energy (EGLE) introduced some of the strictest drinking water standards in the country for PFAS, setting maximum contaminant levels (MCLs) for PFOA and PFOS to 8 and 16 ppt respectively (down from previous existing groundwater cleanup standards of 70 ppt for both), and introducing MCLs for 5 other previously unregulated PFAS compounds, limiting PFNA to 6 ppt, PFHxA to 400,000 ppt, PFHxS to 51 ppt, PFBS to 420 ppt and HFPO-DA to 370 ppt. The change adds 38 additional sites to the state's list of known PFAS contaminated areas, bringing the total number of known sites to 137. About half of these sites are landfills and 13 are former plating facilities.

In 2022 PFOS was found in beef produced at a Michigan farm. The cattle had been fed crops fertilized with contaminated biosolids. State agencies issued a consumption advisory, but did not order a recall, because there currently is no PFOS contamination in beef government standards.

Minnesota
In February 2018, 3M settled a lawsuit for $850 million related to contaminated drinking water in Minnesota.

New Jersey
In 2018 the New Jersey Department of Environmental Protection (NJDEP) published a drinking water standard for PFNA. Public water systems in New Jersey are required to meet a maximum contaminant level (MCL) standard of 13 ppt. In 2020 the state set a PFOA standard at 14 ppt and a PFOS standard at 13 ppt.

In 2019 NJDEP filed lawsuits against the owners of two plants that had manufactured PFASs, and two plants that were cited for water pollution from other chemicals. The companies cited are DuPont, Chemours and 3M. NJDEP also declared five companies to be financially responsible for statewide remediation of the chemicals. Among the companies accused were Arkema and Solvay regarding a West Deptford Facility in Gloucester County, where Arkema manufactured PFASs, but Solvay claims to have never manufactured but only handled PFASs. The companies denied liability and contested the directive. In June 2020, the US Environmental Protection Agency and NJ Department of Environmental Protection published a paper reporting that a unique family of PFAS used by Solvay, chloroperfluoropolyether carboxylates (ClPFPECAs), were contaminating the soils of New Jersey as far from the Solvay facility as 150 km. and the ClPFPECAs were found in water as well.

Later in 2020, the New Jersey state attorney general filed suit in the New Jersey Superior Court against Solvey regarding PFAS contamination of the state's environment. In May 2021, Solvay issued a press release that the company is "discontinuing the use of fluorosurfactants in the U.S.".

Washington 
Washington State has a history of PFAS releases to the environment.

In addition, five military installations in Washington State have been identified by the U.S. Senate Committee on Environment and Public Works as having PFAS contamination. Toward environmental and consumer protections, the Washington State Department of Ecology published a Chemical Action Plan in November 2021, and in June 2022 the governor tasked the Washington State Department of Ecology with phasing out manufacture and import of products containing PFASs. Initial steps taken by the Washington State Department of Health to protect the public from exposure through drinking water have included setting State Action Levels for five PFASs (PFOA, PFOS, PFNA, PFHxS, and PFBS), which were implemented in November 2021.

Class action lawsuits
In February 2017, DuPont and Chemours (a DuPont spin-off) agreed to pay $671 million to settle lawsuits arising from 3,550 personal injury claims related to releasing of PFASs from their Parkersburg, West Virginia plant, into the drinking water of several thousand residents. This was after a court-created independent scientific panel, the "C8 Science Panel", found a "probable link" between C8 exposure and six illnesses: kidney and testicular cancer, ulcerative colitis, thyroid disease, pregnancy-induced hypertension and high cholesterol.

In October 2018, a class action suit was filed by an Ohio firefighter against several producers of fluorosurfactants, including the 3M and DuPont corporations, on behalf of all US residents who may have adverse health effects from exposure to PFASs.

This story is told in the film Dark Waters, released in November 2019, produced by the actor Mark Ruffalo and directed by Todd Haynes.

Corporate and federal government suppression of information
Starting in the 1970s, 3M scientists learned that PFOS and PFOA were toxic to humans, documenting damage to the human immune system. Also in the 1970s, 3M scientists found that these substances accumulate over time in the human body. However, 3M suppressed revelation of these facts to the public or to regulators.

In 2018 White House staff and EPA pressured the U.S. Agency for Toxic Substances and Disease Registry to suppress a study that showed PFASs to be even more dangerous than previously thought.

Water contamination by U.S. military bases
The water in and around at least 126 U.S. military bases has been contaminated by high levels of PFASs because of their use of firefighting foams since the 1970s, according to a study by the U.S. Department of Defense. Of these, 90 bases reported PFAS contamination that had spread to drinking water or groundwater off the base. A 2022 Pentagon report acknowledged that approximately 175,000 U.S. military personnel at two dozen American military facilities drank water contaminated by higher PFAS levels than the U.S. Environmental Protection Agency limit. However, according to an analysis of the Pentagon report by the non-partisan Environmental Working Group, the Pentagon report downplayed the number of people exposed to PFAS, which was much higher, probably in excess of 640,000 at 116 military facilities, than the number advanced by the Pentagon report. The EWG found that the Pentagon also omitted from its report some types of diseases that are likely to be caused by PFAS exposure, omitting testicular cancer, kidney disease, and fetal abnormalities.

Occupational exposure 
Occupational exposure to PFASs occurs in numerous industries due to the widespread use of PFASs in products and as an element of industrial process streams. PFASs are used in more than 200 different ways in industries as diverse as electronics and equipment manufacturing, plastic and rubber production, food and textile production, and building and construction. Occupational exposure to PFASs can occur at fluorochemical facilities that produce PFASs and other manufacturing facilities that use PFASs for industrial processing like the chrome plating industry. Workers who handle PFAS-containing products can also be exposed during their work. Examples include people who install PFAS-containing carpets and leather furniture with PFAS coatings, professional ski-waxers using PFAS-based waxes, and fire-fighters who use PFAS-containing foam and wear flame-resistant protective gear impregnated with PFASs.

People who are exposed to PFASs through their jobs typically have higher levels of PFASs in their blood than the general population. Additionally, while the general population is exposed to PFASs through ingested food and water, occupational exposure includes both accidental ingestion and inhalation exposure in settings where a PFAS becomes volatilized. There has been increased attention to the health risks associated with exposure to PFASs, which can affect the immune system, increase cholesterol, and increase the risk of cancer. The severity of PFAS-associated health effects can vary based on the length of exposure, level of exposure, and health status. In 2009, under decision SC-4/17, perfluorooctane sulfonic acid, its salts and perfluorooctane sulfonyl fluoride were listed in Annex B of the 2009 Stockholm Convention on Persistent Organic Pollutants, dictating acceptable purposes and specific exemptions to the chemical usage. Among these exemptions are numerous uses in manufacturing as well as firefighting foams.

Professional ski wax technicians 
Professional ski wax technicians are disproportionately exposed to PFASs from the glide wax used to coat the bottom of skis to reduce the friction between the skis and snow. During this process, the wax is heated to 130-220 °C, which releases fumes and airborne fluorinated compounds. Exposure to aerosolized PFASs is associated with alveolic edema, polymer fume fever, severe dyspnea, decreased pulmonary function, and respiratory distress syndrome in those chronically exposed. In a 2010 study, blood serum levels of PFOA were significantly higher in ski wax technicians compared to levels of the general Swedish population. Serum levels of PFOA in ski wax technicians were positively correlated with years spent working, suggesting bioaccumulation of PFOA over time.

Manufacturing workers 
People who work at fluorochemical production plants and in manufacturing industries that use PFASs in the industrial process can be exposed to PFASs in the workplace. Much of what we know about PFASs exposure and health effects began with medical surveillance studies of workers exposed to PFASs at fluorochemical production facilities. These studies began in the 1940s and were conducted primarily at U.S. and European manufacturing sites. Between the 1940s and 2000s, thousands of workers exposed to PFASs participated in research studies that advanced scientific understanding of exposure pathways, toxicokinetic properties, and adverse health effects associated with exposure.

The first research study to report elevated organic fluorine levels in the blood of fluorochemical workers was published in 1980. This study established inhalation as a potential route of occupational PFAS exposure by reporting measurable levels of organic fluorine in air samples at the facility. Workers at fluorochemical production facilities have higher levels of PFOA and PFOS in their blood than the general population. Serum PFOA levels in fluorochemical workers are generally below 20,000 ng/mL but have been reported as high as 100,000 ng/mL whereas the mean PFOA concentration among non-occupationally exposed cohorts in the same time frame was 4.9 ng/mL. Among fluorochemical workers, those with direct contact with PFASs have higher PFAS concentrations in their blood than those with intermittent contact and those with no direct PFAS contact. Further, blood PFAS levels decline when direct contact ceases. Levels of PFOA and PFOS have declined in US and European fluorochemical workers due to improved facilities, increased usage of personal protective equipment, and the phase out of these chemicals from production. However, occupational exposure to PFASs in manufacturing continues to be an active area of study in China with numerous investigations linking worker exposure to various PFASs.

Firefighters 

PFASs are commonly used in Class B firefighting foams due to their hydrophobic and lipophobic properties as well as the stability of the chemicals when exposed to high heat. Due to firefighters' potential for exposure to PFASs through these aqueous film forming foams (AFFF), studies raise concerns that firefighters are especially prone to high concentrations of serum PFASs.

Research into occupational exposure for firefighters is emergent, though frequently limited by underpowered study designs. A 2011 cross-sectional analysis of the C8 Health Studies found higher levels of PFHxS in firefighters compared to the sample group of the region, with other PFASs at elevated levels, without reaching statistical significance. A 2014 study in Finland studying eight firefighters over three training sessions observed select PFASs (PFHxS and PFNA) increase in blood samples following each training event. Due to this small sample size, a test of significance was not conducted. A 2015 cross-sectional study conducted in Australia found  that accumulation of PFOS and PFHxS was positively associated with years of occupational AFFF exposure through firefighting.

Due to their use in training and testing, recent studies indicate occupational risk for military members and firefighters, as higher levels of PFASs in exposure were indicated in military members and firefighters when compared to the general population. Further, exposure to PFASs is prevalent among firefighters not only due to its use in emergencies but because it is also used in personal protective equipment. In support of these findings, states like Washington and Colorado have moved to restrict and penalize the use of Class B firefighting foam which contains PFASs for firefighter training and testing.

Exposure after World Trade Center terrorist attacks 
The September 11, 2001 collapse of the World Trade Center buildings in New York City resulted in the release of chemicals from the destruction of construction and electrical material and long-term chemical fires. This collapse caused the release of several toxic chemicals, including fluorinated surfactants used as soil- and stain-resistant coatings on various materials. First responders to this incident were exposed to PFOA, PFNA, and PFHxS, through inhalation of dust and smoke released during and after the collapse of the World Trade Center.

Fire responders who were working at or near ground zero were assessed for respiratory and other health effects from exposure to emissions at the World Trade Center. Early clinical testing showed a high prevalence of respiratory health effects. Early symptoms of exposure often presented with persistent coughing and wheezing. PFOA and PFHxS levels were present in both smoke and dust exposure. Yet, first responders with smoke exposures had higher concentrations of PFOA and PFHxS than those with dust exposures.

Remediation solutions

Water treatment 
Several technologies are currently available for remediating PFASs in liquids. These technologies can be applied to drinking water supplies, groundwater, industrial wastewater, surface water, and other miscellaneous applications (such as landfill leachate). Influent concentrations of PFASs can vary by orders of magnitude for specific media or applications. These influent values, along with other general water quality parameters (for example, pH) can influence the performance and operating costs of the treatment technologies. The technologies are:
 Sorption
 Granular activated carbon
 Biochar
 Ion exchange
 Precipitation/flocculation/coagulation
 Redox manipulation (chemical oxidation and reduction technologies)
 Membrane filtration
 Reverse osmosis
 Nanofiltration
 Supercritical water oxidation

Private and public sector applications of one or more of these methodologies above are being applied to remediation sites throughout the United States and other international locations. Most solutions involve on-site treatment systems, while others are leveraging off-site infrastructure and facilities, such as a centralized waste treatment facility, to treat and dispose of the PFAS pool of compounds.

Most recently, a 2022 study published in the Journal of Environmental Engineering found that a heat-and pressure-based technique known as supercritical water oxidation destroyed 99% of the PFASs present in a water sample. During this process, oxidizing substances are added to PFAS-contaminated water and then the liquid is heated above its critical temperature of 374 degrees Celsius at a pressure of more than 220 bars. The water becomes supercritical (being neither gas nor liquid), and, in this state, water-repellent substances such as PFASs dissolve much more readily.

Theoretical and early-stage solutions 
The Michigan State University-Fraunhofer team has a viable solution to treat PFAS-contaminated wastewater that, in 2018, was reported to be ready for a pilot-scale investigation. The electrochemical oxidation system used boron-doped diamond electrodes, in a process breaking down the contaminants' formidable molecular bonds and cleaning the water while systematically destroying the hazardous compounds.

"EO, or electrochemical oxidation, is a simple, clean, and effective method for destruction of PFASs and other co-contaminants as a complementary procedure to other wastewater treatment processes," said Cory Rusinek, an electrochemist at MSU-Fraunhofer. "If we can remove it from wastewater, we can reduce its occurrence in surface waters."

In September 2019, it was reported Acidimicrobium sp. strain A6 could be a potential remediator of PFAS, including saturated ones such as PFOS. PFAS with unsaturated bonds are easier to break down: the commercial dechlorination culture KB1 (contains Dehalococcoides) is capable of breaking down such substances, but not saturated PFAS. When alternative, easier-to-digest substrates are present, microbes may prefer them over PFAS.

Chemical treatment
A study published in the journal Science in August 2022 indicated that perfluoroalkyl carboxylic acids (PFCAs) are able to be "mineralized" via heating in a polar aprotic solvent such as dimethyl sulfoxide. The perfluoroanion then "mineralizes" into sodium fluoride and other salts such as sodium trifluoroacetate, formate, carbonate, oxalate and glycolate. The process does not work on perfluorosulfonic acids such as PFOS. A more recent study published in Chemical Science shows breakdown of C-F bonds and their mineralization as YF3 or YF6 clusters. Another study in the Journal of the American Chemical Society described the PFAs breakdown using metal-organic frameworks (MOFs).

Example chemicals
Some common per- and polyfluoroalkyl substances:

 Polytetrafluoroethylene aka PTFE aka Teflon
 Perfluorinated carboxylic acids
 Fluorotelomers
 Perfluorosulfonic acids
 Others:

Films 
 The Devil We Know (2018)
 Dark Waters (2019)

See also 
 Timeline of events related to per- and polyfluoroalkyl substances
 Entegris, formerly Fluoroware, of Chaska, MN, manufacturer of teflon components for health and semiconductor Fabs
 FSI International, now TEL FSI
 Polytetrafluoroethylene (PTFE)
 Fluoropolymer, subclass of per- and polyfluoroalkyl substances

References

Further reading

External links 
 Per- and Polyfluoroalkyl Substances (PFAS) at the National Toxicology Program
 Per- and Polyfluoroalkyl Substances and Your Health at the Agency for Toxic Substances and Disease Registry
 Per- and Polyfluoroalkyl Substances (PFAS) at the United States Environmental Protection Agency
 Per- and polyfluoroalkyl substances (PFASs) at the European Chemicals Agency
 PFAS Contamination [map] in the U.S. by the Environmental Working Group
 Per- and Polyfluoroalkyl substances, National Institute for Occupational Safety and Health
 The Forever Pollution Project – Journalists tracking PFAS across Europe
 PFAS contamination in Queensland, Australia, State Library of Queensland

Organofluorides
Pollutants
Surfactants
Environment and health
Occupational safety and health
Hazardous air pollutants